The 2001 IBF World Championships, also known as the World Badminton Championships, were held in the Palacio de Deportes de San Pablo, Seville, Spain, between 3 June and 10 June 2001.

Host city selection
Eindhoven, Seville, and Seoul submitted bids to host the championships. The Korean bid was withdrawn at the last minute. Seville was announced as the host by International Badminton Federation dUring a council meeting in Copenhagen.

Medalists

Medal table

Events

References

External links 
BWF results

 
Badminton
World Championships
Sports competitions in Seville
2001
Badminton tournaments in Spain
International sports competitions hosted by Spain
2001,IBF World Championships